Route 410, also known as Dorset Trail, is an  north-south highway on the northern coast of Newfoundland in the Canadian province of Newfoundland and Labrador. It leads from Sheppardville, at Route 1 (Trans-Canada Highway), to a dead end in Fleur de Lys, Newfoundland and Labrador. Route 410 serves as the primary roadway access on-and-off the Baie Verte Peninsula. Baie Verte is the most populous community along the route.

In 2022, Route 410 was voted the Worst Road in Atlantic Canada by the Canadian Automobile Association's Worst Roads list.

Route description

Route 410 begins in Sheppardville at an intersection with Route 1 (Trans-Canada Highway) and it heads north to cross the Indian River and wind its way through rural hilly terrain for several kilometres. The highway passes by Flatwater Pond Park to have intersections with Route 411 (Purbeck's Cove Road) and Route 413 (Burlington Road) before passing through more rural areas. Route 410 now has an intersection with Route 414 (La Scie Highway) before entering Baie Verte. It has an intersection with Route 412 (Seal Cove Road) before passing through neighbourhoods and downtown. The highway now leaves Baie Verte and winds its way through hilly terrain for the next several kilometres. Route 410 has a Y-Intersection with a local road leading to Coachman's Cove before entering Fleur de Lys, where Route 410 comes to a dead end after passing through town.

Major intersections

Attractions along Route 410

Flatwater Pond Park (former Provincial Park)

See also 

List of Newfoundland and Labrador highways

References

410